The Southern Indiana Screaming Eagles baseball program represents the University of Southern Indiana in the NCAA's Division I level. They have won the Division II Tournament national championship twice. The Screaming Eagles play their home games at the 500 seat USI Baseball Field, and are coached by Tracy Archuleta.

Major League Baseball
Southern Indiana has had 7 Major League Baseball Draft selections since the draft began in 1965.

See also
 Southern Indiana Screaming Eagles

References